Henry, Duke of Burgundy may refer to:
Henry I, Duke of Burgundy (946–1002), called The Great
Henry II, Duke of Burgundy (1008–1060), also Henry I of France